People With AIDS (PWA) means "person with HIV/AIDS", also sometimes phrased as, Person Living with AIDS. It is a term of self-empowerment, adopted by those with the virus in the early years of the pandemic (the 1980s), as an alternative to the passive implications of "AIDS patient". The phrase arose largely from the ACT UP activist community, however use of the term may or may not indicate that the person is associated with any particular political group.

The PWA self-empowerment movement believes that those living with HIV/AIDS have the human rights to "take charge of their own life, illness, and care, and to minimize dependence on others". The predominant attitude is that one should not assume that one's life is over and will end soon solely because they have been diagnosed with HIV/AIDS. Although most of the earliest organizers have died, and organizations dissolved or reconfigured into AIDS service organizations (ASOs), the self-empowerment and self-determination aspects of the movement continue.

History

New York HIV/AIDS activists 
In New York City in 1982, one of the first People With AIDS (PWA) groups in the east was formed by Michael Callen and Richard Berkowitz. Callen and Berkowitz met through their doctor, Joseph Sonnabend. Initially, Callen and Berkowitz attended a peer support group for people with AIDS at Beth Israel Hospital, as well as meetings of Gay Men's Health Crisis.

After some time, however, the two grew frustrated with the meetings, and left to form Gay Men With AIDS. In the same year, they wrote an article for the New York Native titled "We Know Who We Are: Two Gay Men Declare War on Promiscuity". In it, they put forth that AIDS was the result of not a single virus, but a cumulative overload of the immune system, called the Immune Overload Theory, from sexual promiscuity and abuses of the body. This idea was proven wrong. (See HIV/AIDS denialism.)

In mid-to-late 1982, Callen, Matthew Sarner, and several other people with AIDS became aware of the New York AIDS Network, which met every Tuesday morning at the East Village offices of the Community Health Project. The New York AIDS Network was founded by Hal Kooden, Virginia Apuzzo and a doctor, Roger Enlow, as an open political forum for the sharing of information related to AIDS.

As those in New York grew frustrated from listening to doctors, nurses, lawyers, insurance experts and social workers talk about AIDS, they realized they were hearing very little from the "real" experts. The decision was made to attend the Second National AIDS Forum at the National Lesbian and Gay Health Conference, which was sponsored by the Lesbian and Gay Health Education Foundation. By this point, some of the activists in New York learned of Bobbi Campbell and others in San Francisco. They learned that Campbell and others would be in attendance, and had been calling on organizations that provided AIDS services to sponsor gay men in order so that they may attend the conference. Alan Long, another person with AIDS, sponsored three of the New York activists to attend the conference in Denver.

San Francisco
Bobbi Campbell was a gay San Francisco man who was diagnosed with AIDS in September 1981, making him one of the first people in the US to be diagnosed with AIDS. On the recommendation of Marcus Conant, a doctor specializing in AIDS care, Bobbi began meeting with another man diagnosed with HIV, Dan Turner. The two met at Turner’s house in the Castro. There, they laid the groundwork for what was to become known as People with AIDS San Francisco. After that, Turner was invited to speak at the posthumous birthday party of Harvey Milk, the openly gay city supervisor of San Francisco who had been assassinated in 1978. On Castro street, Turner, as well as Campbell, identified themselves publicly as having AIDS. Turner’s speech urged people to do three things: keep informed, be cautious but not paranoid, and be supportive. This was the first of many speaking events for Campbell and Turner.

Shortly afterwards, a meeting was held to form the KS/AIDS Foundation, which later became the San Francisco AIDS Foundation. In May 1983, the first AIDS candlelight march led and organized by people with AIDS was held. The stated goal of the march was to draw attention to the plight of those with AIDS and to remember those who had died. The march was led by a banner with the slogan "Fighting For Our Lives", which became the motto of the movement.

Later that month, on 23 May 1983, People With AIDS San Francisco voted to send Campbell and Turner to the National Lesbian and Gay Health Conference, at which the Second National AIDS Forum would be held.

The Denver conference
At the conference, which had the theme "Health Pioneering in the Eighties", people with AIDS from around the country met, gathering in a hospitality suite organized by Helen Shietinger, R.N. and Dan Bailey, who coordinated the event.

Debate

Bobbi Campbell took charge of the discussion. He believed in a political network with groups of AIDS infected people in every major city. It was believed that these groups would then form a National Association of People With AIDS. There was very little friction between those in attendance, with only small arguments such as the terms patients and victims versus people with AIDS, the latter of which was agreed on as being the label of choice. This discussion led to the drafting of The Denver Principles.

The Denver Principles
The Denver Principles were drafted during the conference. They read:

The drafters of The Denver Principles stormed the closing of the conference in order to present their work. At the presentation, the San Francisco activists brought the "Fighting For Our Lives" banner. The presentation brought the crowd to tears, and it was ten minutes until the audience was able to compose itself. The keynote speaker, Ginny Apuzzo, in response to the presentation, opened with, "if those health care providers in attendance were the health care pioneers, then those of us with AIDS were truly the trailblazers".

After the Denver Conference

After the Denver Conference, five of the activists (Bobbi Campbell, Richard Berkowitz, Artie Felson, Matthew Sarner, and Mike Campbell) began to plan for the National Association of People with AIDS while on the smoking section of the plane. Afterwards, the first of the political organizations planned was formed, called simply PWA-New York. While PWA-New York initially was met with resistance by the Gay Men's Health Crisis, the two organizations learned to coexist.

PWA-New York is noted for designing the first safer sex poster to appear in New York bathhouses. Across the country, PWA organizations became active. In Denver, local PWA members took part in parades and lobbied in the legislature, in general, putting a human face on the disease. In San Francisco, posters similar to those in New York were distributed.

In June 1984, the annual Gay Freedom Day Parade in San Francisco was dedicated to people with AIDS. People With AIDS marched near the front of the parade, with Bobbi Campbell and the "Fighting For Our Lives" banner.

PWA Coalitions and National Organizations

By the mid-eighties, PWA-New York faced challenges. A negative environment, combined with the deaths of many founders, led to the group being disbanded. However, the New York activists were quick to rebound, forming the PWA Coalition. PWA Coalitions continue to exist today throughout the country. In 1987, the National Association of People With AIDS was incorporated as a 501(c)3 not–for–profit corporation to be the national voice of people with AIDS. It was the oldest national AIDS organization in the United States and the oldest national network of people living with HIV/AIDS in the world when on February 14, 2013 NAPWA declared bankruptcy and announced it was suspending operations.

The Denver Principles Project

In 2009, the National Association of People with AIDS (NAPWA) and POZ magazine announced a new initiative called The Denver Principles Project. The Denver Principles Project will recommit the HIV community to the Denver Principles and dramatically increase NAPWA's membership. With a vastly increased membership, NAPWA will be better able to advocate for effective HIV prevention and care, as well as to combat the stigma that surrounds HIV and impedes education, prevention and treatment of HIV.

PWA Society in Vancouver 
The PWA Society in Vancouver, Canada, was one of the first advocacy groups to focus on the needs of AIDS patients. The organization devoted a great deal of effort to supporting and advocating for people with AIDS, including sending blood samples to the United States for testing because no facilities existed in Vancouver at the time and promoting alternative therapies through their Community Health Fund. This led to the formation of a Vancouver chapter of ACT UP, a more direct action-oriented activist group. Despite challenges faced by members of the lesbian community, the PWA Society persisted in their partnership with the LGBTQ+ community to fight for funding and awareness of the disease.  Activist Cynthia Brooke notes that she faced challenges as a lesbian advocate, but the partnership between gay men and lesbians persisted within the ACT UP Vancouver chapter. The PWA Society's early efforts in the fight against AIDS in Vancouver remain historically significant and ongoing.

See also
 Think Positive — organization in Lebanon

References

 https://web.archive.org/web/20090209192902/http://napwa.org/  Retrieved 22 January 2006.
 https://web.archive.org/web/20050527203527/http://www.dallasvoice.com/articles/dispArticle.cfm?Article_ID=3818 . Retrieved 24 June 2005.
 http://members.aol.com/sigothinc/pwahist1.htm . Retrieved 24 June 2005.
 https://web.archive.org/web/20021126164729/http://adam-carr.net/002.html . Retrieved 24 June 2005.
 http://www.actupny.org/documents/Denver.html . Retrieved 24 June 2005.
 http://www.napwa.org/denverprinciplesproject/index.shtml . Retrieved 10 March 2009.

External links
 People with AIDS Coalition records, 1981-1993. Manuscripts and Archives, New York Public Library.

HIV/AIDS activism
HIV/AIDS in the United States
20th century in San Francisco
LGBT culture in San Francisco